The Honda CB350 is a  OHC parallel twin cylinder, four-stroke motorcycle produced by Honda for model years 1968 through 1973. With its reliable engine and dual Keihin carburetors, it became one of Honda's best-selling models. More than 250,000 were sold in five years, with 67,180 sold in 1972 alone.  The CB350 evolved during its production run with cosmetic changes and improvements to the suspension and brakes.

Like its predecessor, the CB77 Superhawk, the CB350 was also offered in scrambler form, as the CL350, with high-mounted exhausts and a 19-inch front wheel, and as the SL350, with upswept exhausts and off-road styling.

In 1974 the Honda CB360 twin replaced the CB350 but was only available for two years. Note: The four-cylinder CB350F, introduced in 1972, was a completely different model.

In 2020 the Honda H'ness CB350 was released in India.

New generation
On 30 September 2020, Honda launched the new CB350 with a new engine, new designs and new alloy wheels in India, through select Honda Dealerships. Deliveries of the Honda CB350 started on 17 October 2020. It also featured LED round headlights, dual horns, LED taillights, Bluetooth connectivity and a hazard light switch. It came with two variants: DLX and DLX Pro. On 16 November 2020, the Honda CB350 surpassed 1,000 deliveries. I

Gallery

References

External links

 CB350 Super Sport at American Honda Motor (archive)

CB350
Standard motorcycles
Motorcycles introduced in 1968
Motorcycles powered by straight-twin engines